Joseph Hamilton Beattie (1808-1871) was a locomotive engineer with the London and South Western Railway. Joseph Beattie was born in Ireland on 12 May 1808. He was educated in Belfast and initially apprenticed to his father, a Derry architect. He moved to England in 1835 to serve as an assistant to Joseph Locke on the Grand Junction Railway and from 1837 on the London and Southampton Railway.  After the line opened he became the carriage and wagon superintendent at Nine Elms and succeeded John Viret Gooch as locomotive engineer on 1 July 1850.

Locomotives
Initially he designed a series of singles, but the weight of the Southampton and Salisbury expresses led to the development of 2-4-0s. He continued to develop the design over the next 20 years. In addition he developed a series of 2-2-2 and 2-4-0 well tanks and three classes of 0-6-0s. His locomotives were amongst the most efficient of the time.  Three of his most famous locomotive design, the 0298 Class 2-4-0 well tanks, were in service for 88 years, until 1962. 2 have been preserved - see the Swanage Railway, Bodmin & Wenford Railway and  the National Railway Museum, York.

Locomotive classes

Innovations
Beattie was a highly innovative engineer, introducing the country's first successful 2-4-0 locomotive, pioneering feedwater heating, balanced slide valves and coal-burning fireboxes. Since the Rainhill Trials in 1829, it had been accepted that the smoke emitted by burning coal was a nuisance. Railway companies accepted the need to burn coke (a smokeless fuel) in their locomotives, but this was much more expensive than coal, and several locomotive engineers sought a method by which coal could be burned smokelessly. One such engineer was Beattie, who designed a boiler suitable for coal in 1853.

Death
On 18 October 1871, Beattie died of diphtheria and was succeeded as locomotive engineer by his son William George Beattie.

References 

Bradley, D.L., (1989), LSWR Locomotives The Early Engines 1838-53 and the Beattie Classes, Wild Swan

External links 
 South Western Circle

1808 births
1871 deaths
Engineers from Belfast
Locomotive builders and designers
Locomotive superintendents
Deaths from diphtheria
London and South Western Railway people
British railway mechanical engineers
19th-century British engineers